The 2018 Cotton Bowl Classic was a college football bowl game played on December 29, 2018, at AT&T Stadium in Arlington, Texas. The 83rd Cotton Bowl Classic was a College Football Playoff semifinal, the game featured two of the four teams selected by the College Football Playoff Selection Committee—Notre Dame from the NCAA FBS independents and Clemson from the ACC. The game started slow on offense with only 2 field goals in the first quarter, the 3 points for Notre Dame were the only points they scored, as Clemson dominated all the way 30-3. They advanced to face the winner of the Orange Bowl (Alabama) to compete in the 2019 College Football Playoff National Championship. It was one of the 2018–19 bowl games concluding the 2018 FBS football season.  Sponsored by the Goodyear Tire and Rubber Company, the game was officially known as the College Football Playoff Semifinal at the Goodyear Cotton Bowl Classic.

Teams
The game featured second-ranked Clemson of the Atlantic Coast Conference (ACC) against third-ranked Notre Dame, an FBS independent. This was the first time that the two programs met in a bowl game; their more recent regular season meeting had been in 2015, won by Clemson. The only prior Cotton Bowl to feature two undefeated teams had been the 1948 edition, which ended in a 13–13 tie between Penn State and SMU.

Clemson Tigers

Clemson defeated Pitt in the 2018 ACC Championship Game on December 1, then received their bid to the Cotton Bowl with the release of final CFP rankings on December 2. The Tigers entered the bowl with a 13–0 record (8–0 in conference). On December 27, it was confirmed that three Clemson players, including starting defensive lineman Dexter Lawrence, would be suspended from playing in the game by the NCAA, due to drug testing showing "trace amounts of a banned substance", which was identified as ostarine.

This was Clemson's second Cotton Bowl bid in school history, following its appearance in the 1940 edition. It was also the first Cotton Bowl appearance by an active ACC member since Maryland's appearance in the 1977 edition.

Notre Dame Fighting Irish

Notre Dame received their bid to the Cotton Bowl with the release of final CFP rankings on December 2. The independent Fighting Irish entered the bowl with a 12–0 record. This was Notre Dame's first Cotton Bowl berth since the 1994 edition and its eighth overall.

Game summary

Scoring summary

Statistics

References

External links
 
Box score at ESPN

Cotton Bowl Classic
2018–19 College Football Playoff
Cotton Bowl Classic
Cotton Bowl Classic
21st century in Arlington, Texas
Cotton Bowl Classic
Clemson Tigers football bowl games
Notre Dame Fighting Irish football bowl games